The Chevrolet Lova can refer to:
 A rebadge of the Chevrolet Aveo (T200), sold in China from 2006 to 2010
 The Chevrolet Lova RV, a subcompact MPV sold in China from 2016 to 2019

Lova